The 2021 Summer Series was a series of friendly soccer matches played between six clubs from Alberta, British Columbia, and Manitoba. The eight matches were held to showcase a potential national second division within the Canadian soccer league system.

The Summer Series ran from 26 June to 8 August, 2021. All fixtures played were sanctioned by the Canadian Soccer Association.

Teams

Results

Matches

Table

References 

Summer Series